Railways with a track gauge of  fall within the category of broad gauge railways. , they were extant in Australia, Brazil and Ireland.

History 
600 BC

1840

1843

1846
 The Regulating the Gauge of Railways Act 1846 made  mandatory throughout all of Ireland.

1847

1854
 The first Australian railway to operate steam-powered freight and passenger services, Melbourne and Hobson's Bay Railway Company, was built as a  line.

1858
 The first Brazilian  railway was opened: the Companhia de Estrada de Ferro Dom Pedro II.

1863

Nomenclature 
 In the Republic of Ireland and the United Kingdom, the gauge is known as Irish gauge. In Ireland it is also common to hear it referred to as "standard gauge" when distinguishing it from the various 3 ft gauge railways of the island.
 In Australia, where the states of Victoria and South Australia have this gauge (as did Tasmania in the 19th century), it is known as broad gauge.
 In Brazil, the gauge is mainly known as broad gauge, but occasionally as Irish gauge.

Installations

Similar gauges 
There is also a  gauge. See: Track gauge in Ireland.

Locomotives 

See also 

 Track gauge in Australia

References 

 
Track gauges by name